The S6G reactor is a naval reactor used by the United States Navy to provide electricity generation and propulsion on  attack submarines.  The S6G designation stands for:

 S = Submarine platform
 6 = Sixth generation core designed by the contractor
 G = General Electric was the contracted designer

Design 
This nuclear reactor was designed by General Electric for use on the  attack submarines. The S6G reactor plant consists of the reactor coolant, steam generation, and other support systems that supply steam to the engine room. The S6G is a 165 megawatt (MW) reactor driving two 26 MW steam turbines. 

The Los Angeles-class engine room also contains the steam turbines that generate electricity and drive the propeller shaft.  While exact specifications are classified, the S6G reactor can propel a Los Angeles-class submarine at over  when surfaced and over  while submerged.

Design and operational support for the S6G is provided by Knolls Atomic Power Laboratory (KAPL). The S6G reactor plant was originally designed to use the D1G-2 core, similar to the D2G reactor used on the  guided missile cruiser. The D1G-2 cores are being replaced with D2W cores when the boats are refueled.

References 

United States naval reactors